Teie Idrettsforening is a Norwegian sports club from Nøtterøy, Vestfold. It has sections for association football and team handball.

It was established in 1924, and the club colors are blue and yellow.

The men's football team currently plays in the Fourth Division, the fifth tier of Norwegian football. It played one season in the Second Division in 1996, and after that had a stint in the Third Division from 1997 to 2003.

References

 Official site 

Football clubs in Norway
Sport in Vestfold og Telemark
Nøtterøy
Association football clubs established in 1924
1924 establishments in Norway